TeamViewer AG is an international technology company headquartered in Göppingen, Germany. The company became known for the TeamViewer remote access and support software of the same name. Today, TeamViewer AG offers its customers a global platform for connecting, monitoring, and controlling computers, machines, and other devices. TeamViewer's software is used in companies of all sizes and from all industries, for example, to digitalize processes along the industrial value chain. The company is listed on the stock exchange and is a member of MDAX and TecDAX.

History

Start-up and growth phase
The foundation of TeamViewer dates back to the release of the first version of the software in 2005. To reduce travel cost for customers and present quality management software remotely, the founder of Rossmanith GmbH developed the TeamViewer software. The software became the core product of TeamViewer GmbH, which today operates as TeamViewer Germany GmbH. The company's business model allowed private users to use the software free of charge, while companies had to purchase a paid license. This model continues to date.

In 2010, TeamViewer GmbH was acquired by GFI Software. In 2014, British private equity firm Permira acquired TeamViewer and helped the company develop its international customer base and expand the scope of its products. With a purchase price of around one billion US dollars, the company was classified as a so-called "unicorn", the designation for an unlisted company worth at least one billion US dollars.

Initial public offering
From the beginning of 2018, the company changed its business model from the previous sale of licenses to subscriptions. This followed a general trend in the IT industry and helped TeamViewer GmbH to grow further. In preparation for an IPO, a new corporate structure was created in 2019. The newly created TeamViewer AG became the owner of the then renamed TeamViewer Germany GmbH.

The initial listing on the Frankfurt Stock Exchange in September 2019 was met with strong investor interest. With an issue volume of 2.2 billion euros, it was the largest IPO of a German technology company since 2000 and the largest IPO in Europe in 2019. By the end of 2019, TeamViewer AG's shares had already been admitted to the MDAX and TecDAX stock indices.

Recently, TeamViewer expanded its portfolio, particularly in industry solutions.

Company
TeamViewer AG is a German stock corporation. Together with its domestic and foreign subsidiaries, it forms the TeamViewer Group. The most important subsidiaries include TeamViewer Germany GmbH, which is responsible for the operating business.

TeamViewer AG's shares are traded on the regulated market (Prime Standard) of the Frankfurt Stock Exchange. Around 75% of TeamViewer AG's shares are in free float. Important shareholders are Permira, Norges Bank, and BlackRock.

Management 
The Management Board of TeamViewer AG consists of Oliver Steil (chief executive officer), Michael Wilkens (chief financial officer) and Peter Turner (chief commercial officer). The extended management board (senior leadership team) consists of nine people. The supervisory board of TeamViewer AG has six members. Its chairman is Abraham Peled.

Locations
TeamViewer AG's headquarters are located at Bahnhofsplatz in Göppingen. The building had been constructed by the city and was originally intended to be used as an extension of the city hall, before it was offered to the rapidly growing company to keep it in Göppingen.

Internationally, TeamViewer AG has numerous subsidiaries and locations on all continents. For example, the key locations for research and development are Yerevan, Armenia, and Ioannina, Greece.

Acquisitions 
 2020: Ubimax, a German specialized augmented reality software provider for wearables
 2021: Upskill, a United States industrial augmented reality software provider
 2021: Xaleon, an Austrian customer engagement solutions provider
 2021: Viscopic, a German mixed reality solutions provider

Products

Software

TeamViewer became known primarily for a solution for remote access to, as well as remote control and maintenance of, computers and mobile devices. The software, called TeamViewer, supports all major desktop, smartphone, and tablet operating systems, including Windows, macOS, Android, and iOS. The software is free for private, non-commercial use.

Platform
The TeamViewer platform enables the connection of a wide range of devices in companies of all sizes and from all industries. Also, TeamViewer offers augmented reality applications to help frontline workers simplify their work processes with step-by-step instructions or to help service technicians remotely solve complex problems on machines.

There are interfaces to other applications and services, such as Microsoft Teams.

Sponsoring
Since 2020, TeamViewer AG has been the main sponsor of the Handball-Bundesliga teams of Frisch Auf Göppingen.

In 2021, TeamViewer AG became the principal shirt sponsor of Manchester United in a five-year deal beginning with the 2021–22 season. The Premier League club also plans to use the company's solutions for the digitalization of fan experiences and business processes. The same year, TeamViewer AG entered a partnership with the Mercedes-AMG Petronas Formula One Team and the Mercedes-EQ Formula E Team. Besides prominent branding on cars and drivers' racing suits and teamwear, the partnership includes transferring use cases from the racetrack to the industrial environment of TeamViewer's customers.

References

External links
 

Publicly traded companies of Germany
German companies established in 2005
Software companies established in 2005
Software companies of Germany
Companies based in Baden-Württemberg